The Roman Catholic Diocese of Solsona is a diocese located in the city of Solsona in the Ecclesiastical province of Tarragona in Catalonia, Spain.

History

 19 July 1593: Established as Diocese of Solsona from the Diocese of Urgell and Diocese of Vic

Ordinaries

Luis Sans y Códol (3 Oct 1594 – 20 Aug 1612 Appointed, Bishop of Barcelona) 
Juan Alvarez Zapata, O. Cist. (11 Mar 1613 – 13 Oct 1623 Died) 
Miguel Santos de Sampedro (15 Apr 1624 – 13 Nov 1630 Appointed, Archbishop of Granada) 
Pedro Puigmartí Funes, O.S.B. (16 Dec 1630 – Nov 1632 Died) 
Diego Serrano Sotomayor, O. de M. (3 Dec 1635 – 30 May 1639 Appointed, Bishop of Segorbe) 
Pedro (de Santiago) Anglada Sánchez, O.A.R. (30 Jan 1640 – 14 Nov 1644 Appointed,  Bishop of Lerida) 
Francisco Roger, O.P. (18 Sep 1656 – 18 Jan 1663 Died) 
Luis de Pons y de Esquerrer, Order of Saint Benedict (11 Aug 1664 – 4 Jan 1685 Died) 
Manuel de Alba (10 Sep 1685 – 24 Aug 1693 Appointed, Bishop of Barcelona) 
Juan Alfonso Valerià y Aloza, O.F.M. (8 Feb 1694 – 1 Jun 1699 Appointed, Bishop of Lerida) 
Guillermo Goñalons, O.S.A. (30 Mar 1700 – 12 Aug 1708 Died) 
Francisco Dorda, O. Cist. (19 Feb 1710 – 3 Dec 1716 Died) 
Pedro Magaña, O.S.B. (10 May 1717 – 9 Feb 1718 Died) 
Tomás Broto y Pérez (27 May 1720 – 8 Apr 1736 Died) 
José Esteban Noriega, O. Praem. (27 Jan 1738 – 10 May 1739 Died) 
Francisco Zarceño Martínez, O.SS.T. (14 Dec 1739 – 23 Jan 1746 Died) 
José Mezquía Díaz de Arrízola, O. de M. (16 Sep 1746 – 9 Sep 1772 Died) 
Rafael Lasala y Locela, O.S.A. (15 Mar 1773 – 17 Jun 1792 Died)
Agustín Vázquez Varela, O. Cist. (17 Jun 1793 – 11 Feb 1794 Died) 
Pedro Nolasco Mora Mora, O. de M. (12 Sep 1794 – 1 Mar 1811 Died) 
Manuel Benito y Tabernero (19 Dec 1814 – 25 Jul 1830 Died) 
Juan José Tejada Sáenz, O. de M. (2 Jul 1832 – 15 Jun 1838 Died) 
Valentín Comellas y Santamaría (18 Dec 1919 – 19 Mar 1945 Died) 
Vicente Enrique y Tarancón (25 Nov 1945 – 12 Apr 1964 Appointed, Archbishop of Oviedo) 
José Bascuñana y López (20 May 1964 – 19 Feb 1977 Resigned) 
Miguel Moncadas Noguera (1 Apr 1977 – 5 Aug 1989 Died) 
Antonio Deig Clotet (7 Mar 1990 – 28 Jul 2001 Retired) 
Jaume Traserra Cunillera (28 Jul 2001 – 3 Nov 2010 Retired) 
 (3 Nov 2010 – 23 Aug 2021 Resigned, to marry)
Francisco Conesa Ferrer (3 January 2022 – present)

See also

Roman Catholicism in Spain

References

External links

 Catholic Hierarchy
  Diocese website (in Catalan)
 

Roman Catholic dioceses in Catalonia
Roman Catholic dioceses in Spain
Religious organizations established in 1593
Roman Catholic dioceses established in the 16th century